is a Japanese record label also working as a subsidiary of TY Limited Incorporated.

Its chairman is Tom Yoda, ex-chairman of Avex Group.

Labels
 Dreamusic Overseas
 Teenage Symphony Label
 Feel Mee (from assets acquired from Interchannel in 2013)

Artists

Domestic
 Funky Monkey Babys
 Doll Elements
 Yōichi Aoyama
 Yūzō Kayama
 Hiroko Nakamura
 Ayaka Hirahara
 Ryoko Moriyama
 Hiroshi Ikematsu
 Kana Oshita
 Color Bottle
 Kawae Minoko
 Shinji Kuno
 Yukie Sone
 Norimasa Fujisawa
 Platinum
 Minji
 Meilin
 Gyunta
 Teenage Symphony (Dreamusic/Teenage Symphony)
 Jam 9
 T4
 Lisa Ono

International
 Elliot Minor
 Dúné
 Erik Mongrain
 Smile.dk
 Sunshine State
 Caitlyn
 Mon Roe
 Kids on Bridges
 BABY BLUE (MNL48 sub-unit)

Reference:

Former
 Jun Shibata (Active, with Victor Entertainment)
 YamaArashi (Active, with Knife Edge)
 Amin (Active, with Victor Entertainment)
 MisaChi (Active, unsigned)
 Miku Nakamura (Active, unsigned)
 Machine
 Rockwell (Active, with U's Music)
 Masanori Sera (Retired, since 2008)
 Silent Siren (Active, with EMI Records Japan)

Distribution
Sony Music Entertainment Japan Incorporated is the current distributor of Dreamusic and is one of its shareholders.

Dreamusic was formerly distributed by Columbia Music Entertainment from 2003 to 2007 and by King Records from 2007 to 2010.

Shareholders
 TY Limited
 Taito
 Takara Tomy
 Sony Music Entertainment Japan
 Gaku Records
 Japan-Asia Holdings
 Dai-ichi Hoki
 Nihon Unicom
 Rentrak
 Atoss International

Reference:

See also
 List of record labels
 Tom Yoda

References

External links
 
 
 

Japanese record labels
Record labels established in 2001